Peter Lemongello (born February 11, 1947) is an American singer known for his double album Love '76.

Early career
Lemongello spent the first part of his career as a cabaret singer, with several appearances on national TV, including 25 on The Tonight Show Starring Johnny Carson. He released his first two records (under the name Pete Lemongello) on the Rare Bird record label to no fanfare. In 1973, he signed to Epic Records. He released one single in December 1973; it failed to chart and he subsequently left the label.

Love '76
Frustrated by his lack of record sales, Lemongello hit upon the idea of creating an album to be sold exclusively on TV. Using a city-by-city marketing strategy, he and his partners began their Love '76 advertising campaign with an around-the-dial TV blitz in the New York market starting January 1, 1976, and ran commercials on all six New York channels 70 to 100 times a week. Sales of the double album skyrocketed him to fame in the New York area, and the campaign entered Los Angeles and Las Vegas.

In a profile in The New York Times, he stated, "Look what this country needs is a white, male superstar they can hang their hat on. They want him clean, and they want him now. That's why I'm playing it this way. I can be what they want." An acquaintance and fan named Bob Pascuzzi bankrolled a promotional roll-out meant to generate interest from financial backers that would result in a deal for an album and concerts. Westbury Music Fair was rented for one show, and an album assembled with one side recorded in the studio, the other consisting of remixes of his tapes. One concert promoter conceded the show had sold out at 2,800 tickets but wondered whether Lemongello could repeat his success in cities with fewer Italians and where he had not advertised as heavily.

Private Stock Records signed Lemongello in April 1976. He then ended his self-promotional efforts and released his second album, Do I Love You, in late 1976.  The album and its subsequent singles failed to chart.

Home construction and legal trouble
Lemongello later worked as a housing contractor in New York and Florida. In the early 1980s he was accused of masterminding two acts of arson on two luxury houses that his construction firm was working on near St. Petersburg, Florida. Lemongello subsequently pled no contest to charges of arson and insurance fraud, in what his lawyer said was a "business decision" to avoid a trial.

On January 15, 1982, Lemongello and his brother, bowler Mike Lemongello, were kidnapped from a construction site, Mike was forced to withdraw more than $50,000 from a bank, and both were then left in the woods. Manny Seoane and Mark Lemongello (the brothers' cousin), both former Major League Baseball pitchers, turned themselves in to police and in 1983 were sentenced to seven years' probation for the crime.

Lemongello was later charged by FBI agents with bankruptcy fraud and lying on loan applications. He spent 16 months in federal prison and was ordered to pay former Houston Astros pitcher Joe Sambito (a former teammate of his cousin Mark) $439,000 for failing to finish building a home for him and reneging on a contract.

Later career 
He has performed at many South Florida venues, in dinner theater in Branson, Missouri, and appeared regularly in the summer in Atlantic City, on Long Island, and in upstate New York. In 2012 he had a one-man song and comedy show titled Meatballs, Matzo Balls and Lemon-Gello, and also re-recorded his 1976 song "Can't Get Enough Of You Girl" with producer and songwriter Jimmy Michaels; it appears on the re-issue of the Michaels album More Things Change.

Parodies
Lemongello was spoofed in the episode of Saturday Night Live that aired May 22, 1976, with Chevy Chase playing a singer named Peter Lemon Mood Ring, who changed colors with every song. Chase reused the name in his 1989 film Fletch Lives.

Singer-songwriter Will Dailey released a promotional video in 2009 for his album Torrent, in which he is forced by his managers to make a (fictitious) commercial for Torrent in the style of the Love '76 commercial.

Personal life 
Lemongello lives in Boca Raton, Florida. He and his wife Karen have a son, Peter Jr., who in 2019 appeared on American Idol.

Discography
 Love '76 (1976), Rapp Records
 Do I Love You (1976), Private Stock Records

References

American male pop singers
American businesspeople
Direct marketing
1947 births
Living people
Musicians from Jersey City, New Jersey
People from North Babylon, New York
Private Stock Records artists